Herman Frederick Kull (March 4, 1930 – September 16, 1998) was an American basketball coach. He served as assistant coach in the National Basketball Association (NBA) and head coach in the Continental Basketball Association (CBA).

Biography
Kull was born on March 4, 1930, in Newark, New Jersey. He attended Montclair State University in Montclair, New Jersey and played on the men's basketball team for three seasons (1952–53, 1955–56, 1956–57). He played 31 games during his three seasons and averaged 4.5 points per game. Kull was the team's assistant coach in 1958. He was also on the school's football team and coached the baseball team in 1959. Kull coached high school basketball in New Jersey after college.

In 1979, the Detroit Pistons hired Kull as an assistant coach. He joined the coaching staff of the New Jersey Nets as an assistant to head coach Stan Albeck in 1983. Kull was hospitalized after suffering chest pains while jogging in 1984. In 1985, the Cleveland Cavaliers hired Kull as a scout. In February 1986, he was promoted to assistant coach after Mo McHone resigned. Posters given away as a promotion shortly after McHone's resignation featured Kull's head crudely affixed over McHone's body. Kull resigned his position with Cleveland in May 1986.

Before the 1985–86 season, Kull was hired by the Golden State Warriors as an assistant coach. He joined the coaching staff of the Sacramento Kings as an assistant to Jerry Reynolds in December 1988. On December 27, Reynolds collapsed during the fourth quarter of a game against the Portland Trail Blazers while protesting a call. Kull served as head coach while Reynolds received medical attention. The following day, with Reynolds hospitalized, Kull served as head coach against the Utah Jazz.

Reynolds wrote of Kull in his 2005 book Reynolds Remembers: 20 Years with the Sacramento Kings:

In January 1991, the San Jose Jammers of the Continental Basketball Association (CBA), hired Kull to replace interim head coach Gary Freitas, who took over for Cory Russell on December 6, 1990. During the 1991–92 season, Kull continued to coach the Jammers, who re-located to Bakersfield, California in the off-season. The team disbanded in January 1992 as a part of Jammers owner Dominic L. Cortese's Chapter 7 bankruptcy proceedings. On February 16, 1992, the Albany Patroons of the CBA fired their head coach Charley Rosen and replaced him with Kull, who finished the season with a 5–10 record. Kevin Mackey replaced Kull the following season. In May 1993, Kull was hired by the CBA Yakima Sun Kings. He coached the team to a 7–17 record before being replaced by Mo McHone.

Kull died on September 16, 1998, in Morristown, New Jersey.

References

1930 births
1998 deaths
American men's basketball coaches
Basketball coaches from New Jersey
Cleveland Cavaliers assistant coaches
Continental Basketball Association coaches
Detroit Pistons assistant coaches
Montclair State University alumni
New Jersey Nets assistant coaches
People from Morristown, New Jersey
Sacramento Kings assistant coaches
Sportspeople from Newark, New Jersey